John Christie born 26 August 1883 in Alva, Clackmannanshire, Scotland was leader of the South African Labour Party from 1946 to 1953. 

1883 births
1953 deaths
People from Clackmannanshire
Scottish emigrants to South Africa
White South African people
South African people of Scottish descent
Labour Party (South Africa) politicians
Members of the House of Assembly (South Africa)
Mayors of Johannesburg